Ochreinauclea missionis is a species of plant in the family Rubiaceae. It is endemic to India.  It is threatened by habitat loss.

The caterpillars of the commander (Limenitis procris), a brush-footed butterfly, utilize this species as a food plant.

References

missionis
Flora of Kerala
Vulnerable plants
Taxonomy articles created by Polbot